Punch King is a boxing video game developed by Full Fat and published by Acclaim Entertainment for Game Boy Advance in 2002.

Reception

The game received "mixed" reviews according to the review aggregation website Metacritic.

References

External links
 

2002 video games
Acclaim Entertainment games
Boxing video games
Full Fat games
Game Boy Advance games
Game Boy Advance-only games
Video games developed in the United Kingdom
Single-player video games